The Tuanku Ja'afar Hospital (HTJS) is a government hospital in Seremban, Negeri Sembilan, Malaysia. It is the largest hospital in Negeri Sembilan.

History
The construction of the hospital began in 1969 and went into operation in 1972 as Seremban General Hospital. On 27 July 2006, the hospital was renamed as Tuanku Ja'afar Hospital.

Background
Tuanku Ja'afar Hospital has 1,070 beds and is the largest hospital in Negeri Sembilan.

See also
 List of hospitals in Malaysia
 Healthcare in Malaysia

References

External links
  

1972 establishments in Malaysia
Buildings and structures in Seremban
Hospitals established in 1972
Hospitals in Negeri Sembilan